The Sarikol Range is a mountain range in the Pamirs on the border of Tajikistan and the People's Republic of China.

The name Sarikol has also been used to describe the local people who are historically known as Sarikolis; the local Sarikoli language and Tashkurgan Town, which was historically known as Sarikol.

Geography
The range divides Tajikistan's Gorno-Badakhshan Autonomous Province and China's Xinjiang Uyghur Autonomous Region and it runs parallel with the Muztagh Range to the east. The range extends  from the Markansu River in the north to the Beyik Pass in the south. On the Tajik part of the range there are 240 glaciers with a total area of 144 km2. The range's drainage basin feeds both the Amu Darya and Tarim River. The range is composed of schist, granite and gneiss.

See also
List of mountains in Tajikistan
China–Tajikistan border

References

Mountain ranges of Xinjiang
Mountain ranges of Tajikistan
China–Tajikistan border
Gorno-Badakhshan Autonomous Region
Pamir Mountains